Joel L. Sussman (born September 24, 1943) is an Israeli crystallographer best known for his studies on acetylcholinesterase, a key protein involved in transmission of nerve signals. He is the Morton and Gladys Pickman Professor of Structural Biology at the Weizmann Institute of Science in Rehovot and its director of the Israel Structural Proteomics Center.

Early life and education
Sussman was born in Philadelphia, Pennsylvania, US.

In 1965, Sussman received his B.A. at Cornell University in math and physics. He received his PhD from MIT in biophysics in 1972, having worked with Cyrus Levinthal. Sussman conducted postdoctoral research in the Hebrew University of Jerusalem in 1972, with Yehuda Lapidot, and in the Duke University in 1973 with Sung-Hou Kim.

Appointments and positions held
Sussman held the following positions at the Weizmann Institute of Science:
 1976–80 – Senior Scientist
 1980–92 – Associate Professor
 1992–date – Professor
 1984–85 – Head, Department of Structural Chemistry
 1988–89 – Head, Kimmelman Center for Biomolecular Structure and Assembly
 2002–date – Incumbent of the Morton and Gladys Pickman Chair of Structural Biology

In 1994–99, he was also the director of the Protein Data Bank (PDB) at the Brookhaven National Laboratory.

Scientific interests and contributions 
Sussman was a pioneer of macromolecular refinement, developing CORELS and applying it to yeast tRNAphe. He subsequently determined the structures of 'bulge'-containing DNA fragments as models for insertion mutations.

Sussman's current research focuses on nervous system proteins, especially acetylcholinesterase (AChE), whose 3D structure was first determined in his lab. This structure revealed:
 AChE is a prototype of the α/β hydrolase fold;
 π-cation interactions play a key role in binding of acetylcholine (ACh) and ligands to AChE;
 Its ACh-binding site assisted in structure-based design of promising leads for novel anti-Alzheimer's drugs;
 Discovered a highly asymmetric charge distribution conserved in 'cholinesterase-like adhesion molecules' (CLAMs), and showed that their cytoplasmic domains are 'intrinsically unfolded' with implications for neural development and plasticity, and led to an algorithm, for predicting whether a protein sequence will fold;
 A novel anchoring device for AChE involving superhelical assembly of its subunits around a polyproline-II helix; 
 The specific chemical and structural damage to proteins produced by synchrotron radiation, e.g. cleavage of a specific disulfide bond even at cryo temperatures.

He has investigated the molecular basis for halophilicity and halotolerance, shedding light on the molecular basis of how proteins function over extreme ranges of salt concentration, with unexpected implications for kidney diseases. He determined the structures of acid-β-glucosidase, a protein defective in Gaucher disease, paving the way to novel therapeutic approaches, and of paraoxonase, a protein relevant to treatment of atherosclerosis.

Honors and awards
 2014 - Ilanit-Katzir Prize for exceptional achievements in the field of Life Sciences (together with Israel Silman)
 2006 – Teva Founders' Award for breakthroughs in molecular medicine (together with Hermona Soreq and Israel Silman)
 2005 – Honorary Professor, Chinese Academy of Sciences
 2005 – Samuel and Paula Elkeles Prize for Outstanding Scientist in the field of medicine in Israel (together with Israel Silman)
 1994 – Elected member, European Molecular Biology Organization (EMBO)

References

External links
Joel Sussman at the Weizmann Institute
The Israel Structural Proteomics Center

1943 births
Cornell University alumni
Israeli chemists
Academic staff of Weizmann Institute of Science
Living people
International Centre for Synchrotron-Light for Experimental Science Applications in the Middle East people